The 2000 Deutsche Tourenwagen Masters was the fourteenth season of premier German touring car championship and also first season under the moniker of Deutsche Tourenwagen Masters since the original series' demise in 1996. Nine events were held with two 40-minute races at each racing weekend.

Pre-season
This was the resurrected DTM's first season since the cancellation of the Deutsche Tourenwagen Meisterschaft at the end of 1996. Mercedes returned to the series after their unfortunate CLR Le Mans project along with H.W.A GmbH and AMG. They were joined by Opel, who brought along the Holzer, Phoenix, Irmscher and Euroteam from the German Super Touring Championship (STW) where they had raced in 1999. The resumption of DTM also meant the end of STW. Audi did not enter, but was still represented through the semi-independent Abt Sportsline team. Two additional teams also ran Mercedes; they were Persson Motorsport and Team Rosberg.

Teams and drivers
The following manufacturers, teams and drivers competed in the 2000 Deutsche Tourenwagen Masters. All teams competed with tyres supplied by Dunlop.

 – Audi did not enter as a manufacturer but Abt Sportsline entered as a semi-independent team.

Race calendar and winners
All races were held in Germany. Each weekend feature two 100 km races, with equal points scales.

Drivers' championship

† Drivers did not finish the race, but were classified as they completed over 90% of the race distance.

Teams' Championship

References

External links
 Official DTM website
 https://web.archive.org/web/20121001235102/http://www.driverdb.com/standings/25-2000/

Deutsche Tourenwagen Masters seasons
Deutsche Tourenwagen Masters